Persatuan Sepakbola Indonesia Musi Rawas (simply known as Persimura) is an Indonesian football club based in Musi Rawas Regency, South Sumatra. They currently compete in the Liga 3 and their homeground is Petanang Stadium.

Persimura Musi Rawas's highest achievement was in 2017, they managed to become champions in the 2017 Liga 3 South Sumatra zone, and stopped in the Big 8 of the 2017 Liga 3, At that time Persimura Musi Rawas was defeated by Blitar United with a score of 1–3. Persimura's own achievements were followed by the women's team, in the 2019 Pertiwi Cup competition, those who represented South Sumatra managed to become champions after defeating Bangka Belitung in the Final.

Players

Current squad

Honours
 Liga 3 South Sumatra
 Champion: 2017

References

External links

Sport in South Sumatra
Football clubs in Indonesia
Football clubs in South Sumatra
Association football clubs established in 1980
1980 establishments in Indonesia